William Crain (born June 20, 1949) is an American film and television director.  He was one of the first black filmmakers from a major film school to achieve commercial success.

Crain was born in Columbus, Ohio. A graduate of UCLA's film school, Crain, unlike many of the so-called "L.A. Rebellion" filmmakers who made films of a deeply personal or political nature, made work consisting almost entirely of mainstream and genre driven works.  Throughout the 1970s he directed TV shows and movies.

In 1972, he directed Blacula. While largely ignored by critics, the film has become somewhat of a cult favorite and made a name for actor William Marshall who played the title character. Crain did other films, then returned to TV show installments which he continues to do today.

Many sources confuse him with another Bill/William Crain who produced educational short films in the 1970s, and directed Mirage (1990) and Midnight Fear (1991).

Filmography
 Brother John (1971) (intern)
 Blacula (1972) (director)
 Dr. Black, Mr. Hyde (1976) (director)
 Nothing as It Seems (2016) (director)

References
 Please update incorrect link reference.

External links

1949 births
African-American film directors
English-language film directors
Living people
Artists from Columbus, Ohio
L.A. Rebellion
UCLA Film School alumni
Blaxploitation film directors
Film directors from Ohio
20th-century African-American people
21st-century African-American people